

Men's 50 m Butterfly - Final

Men's 50 m Butterfly - Semifinals

Men's 50 m Butterfly - Semifinal 01

Men's 50 m Butterfly - Semifinal 01

Men's 50 m Butterfly - Heats

Men's 50 m Butterfly - Heat 01

Men's 50 m Butterfly - Heat 02

Men's 50 m Butterfly - Heat 03

Men's 50 m Butterfly - Heat 04

Men's 50 m Butterfly - Heat 05

Men's 50 m Butterfly - Heat 06

Swimming at the 2006 Commonwealth Games
Men's 50 metre butterfly